The Cathedral of St. Claire, also called Villarrica Cathedral, located in Villarrica in southern Paraguay, is the cathedral of the Roman Catholic Diocese of Villarrica del Espíritu Santo (Dioecesis Villaricensis Spiritus Sancti) Dedicated to St. Clare of Assisi, it is under the pastoral responsibility of the Bishop Ricardo Jorge Valenzuela Rios.

Its history dates back to 1683 when the Franciscans built a chapel in the same place. The current structure was completed in 1891, with a clock tower and three bells, the oldest of which was cast in 1781. It was elevated to cathedral status with the erection of the diocese with the 1929 bull "Universi Dominici" by Pope Pius XI.

See also
Catholic Church in Paraguay

References

Roman Catholic cathedrals in Paraguay
Villarrica, Paraguay
Religious organizations established in 1683
1683 establishments in the Spanish Empire
Roman Catholic churches completed in 1891
19th-century Roman Catholic church buildings in Paraguay